Ammoglanis pulex is a species of pencil catfish found in the Paria Grande River, the Pamoni River, and the Caño Garrapata in Venezuela.

References

Trichomycteridae
Catfish of South America
Taxa named by Mário Cesar Cardoso de Pinna
Taxa named by Kirk O. Winemiller
Fish described in 2020